The Turaga na Ravunisa is a Fijian Chiefly title of the Lau Islands, in particular the village of Lomaloma  on the Island of Vanua Balavu.

The Title
The title holder must be the most senior member or Turaga i Taukei of the Yavusa Gala and generally is held by a man. Initially his title will be Tui Lomaloma and he relinquishes that title upon the traditional installation when he becomes the Ravunisa. The candidate must have white hair or it is believed he will die if he is installed before his hair becomes white  Secondly, approval for the installation must come from the Turaga na Rasau.

A Brief History
The Ravunisa and his people originate from Mualevu from the Senimoli Family and due to a disagreement they left to reside Lomaloma.

Footnotes

References

 Lau Islands, Fiji By A.M Hocart, Published by the Bishop Museum, Hawaii (1929) reference to Ratu Keni Naulumatua as Rasau of Lomaloma and details on his title.
  The Lau Islands (Fiji) and Their Fairy Tales and Folklore - Page 54, by T[homas] R[eginald] St. Johnston, Published 1918 by The Times book co., ltd.Original from the University of Michigan, Digitized Dec 15, 2006, reference to the Rasau and the Ravunisa
 Mara, Ratu Sir Kamisese: "The Pacific Way: A Memoir", University of Hawaii Press, 1997
 Tovata I & II By AC Reid, Printed in Fiji by Oceania printers Fiji (1990) reference to the Rasau and Ravunisa, reference to Lomaloma.

Fijian nobility
Lau Islands